Black Goddess is a 1978 Nigerian-Brazilian film written and directed by Ola Balogun. It stars a largely Brazilian cast that include Sonya Santos, Zózimo Bulbul, Léa Garcia, and Jorge Coutinho. The film is set in both the eighteenth century and the 1970s.

Plot
The protagonist of the movie is Babatunde, played by Zozimo Bulbul. The dying wish of Babatunde's father was for Babatunde to make a journey to Brazil and see what has become of the descendants of his great-grandfather, Oluyole who was abducted and sold into slavery and also search the story of a mysterious legend in the family's history. He is handed a Yemoja sculpture as guide to journey that took him from Lagos to favelas in Brazil and a visit to a candomblé session. The movie's plot used African spiritual embodiment existing as a reality. Babatunde is transported back to the period of his grandfather's time in Brazil with the help of Yemoja.

Cast
Jorge Coutinho as Oluyole
Sonia Santos as Amanda, elisa
Zózimo Bulbul as Babatunde
Léa Garcia as Yemoja
Antônio Pitanga

Production
Black Goddess is the first Nigerian-Brazilian co-production. The film was co-produced by EMBRAFILME and Balogun's Afrocult Foundation. The scenes were shot in Brazil and the language is Portuguese.

Reception
Two critics, Janet Maslin and Kathe Sandler described the film as a melodrama Maslin described the movie has two films, an historical melodrama in the tradition of Roots and a "fiery and forceful tribute to contemporary African culture".

The movie won an award at the 1980 Carthage Film Festival.

References

External links
 

1978 films
Nigerian drama films
Brazilian drama films